Edward Waldo Emerson (July 10, 1844 – January 27, 1930) was an American physician, writer and lecturer.

Biography
Emerson was born in Concord, Massachusetts. He was a son of Ralph Waldo Emerson and Lidian Jackson Emerson, and educated at Harvard, where he graduated in 1866. He graduated from the Harvard Medical School in 1874, and practiced medicine in Concord until 1882, when he received an inheritance and retired from his practice. He was an instructor in art anatomy at the School of the Museum of Fine Arts from 1885 to 1906. He was also an accomplished equestrian.

Emerson was superintendent of schools in Concord and on the board of health and the cemetery and library committees. He was a founding member of the Concord Antiquarian Society (now called the Concord Museum) and a member of the Social Circle.

Emerson married Annie Shepard Keyes of Concord in 1874. Four of their seven children lived to adulthood, and only one of their seven children survived them. Their children were: 
 Ellen Tucker Emerson (1880–1921), who married Charles Milton Davenport when she was 40 in 1920.
 Florence Emerson (b. 1882)
 William Forbes Emerson (b. 1884)
 Raymond Emerson (1886–1977), who lived in Concord, married Amelia Forbes April 19, 1913, and became a civil engineer and later an investment manager.

Family tree

Works
He wrote:
 Emerson in Concord (1888)
 The Life of E. R. Hoar, with Moorfield Storey (1911)
  (1917)
 Early years of the Saturday Club, 1855–1870. Boston: Houghton Mifflin, 1918. 
 Later years of the Saturday Club, 1870–1920. Boston: Houghton Mifflin, 1927.
He edited:
 Correspondence of John Sterling and Ralph Waldo Emerson (1897)
 Centenary Edition of Ralph Waldo Emerson, annotated (1903)
 Life and Letters of General Charles Russell Lowell (1907)
 Emerson's Journals, with Waldo Emerson Forbes (1909)
He made many contributions to magazines.

Notes

References

External links
 

1844 births
1930 deaths
Ralph Waldo Emerson
Harvard Medical School alumni
Physicians from Massachusetts
American male writers
Tufts University faculty
People from Concord, Massachusetts
American people of English descent
Harvard College alumni